Alessandro Bianco (born 1 October 2002) is an Italian professional footballer who plays as a midfielder for Fiorentina.

Early life 
Alessandro Bianco was born in Turin, spending most of its youth in the Metropolitan City of Turin, in a family from Piedmont.

A promising cyclist during his early years, Bianco started to play football as a 7-year-old in Orbassano, but soon joining Torino's academy, Juve's old rival. After progressing through the youth ranks of the club from his hometown, Bianco was not retained by Il Toro as an under-15, and went on to play with amateur side Chisola Calcio, in Vinovo.

Enjoying a few regional and national success with the youth team from Chisola, Bianco quickly attracted the attention of another great Serie A club, signing on loan to ACF Fiorentina in 2018, before making his move a permanent one a year later.

Club career 
After a first season with Fiorentina's Primavera, where his team won the Coppa after beating the likes of Milan and Juventus, he made his first apparences on the bench in Serie A during the 2020–21 season, under Cesare Prandelli.

For his second season in Alberto Aquilani primavera team, Bianco definitely became one of the most prominent member of the under-19, leading his team to another Coppa Primavera win, once more with victories against Milan and Juventus—during which he respectively delivered an assist and scored a goal from a free-kick—before defeating Genoa and eventually Lazio in the final.

After impressing new manager Vincenzo Italiano during the early 2021–22 season, Bianco made his professional debut for ACF Fiorentina on the 13 August 2021, replacing Erick Pulgar during a 4–0 home Coppa Italia win against Cosenza.

Announced on a potential loan move to the Serie B team against which he made his debut, he eventually stayed in Florence, making more bench appearances in Serie A and another on the field in Coppa, again replacing Pulgar, while still playing with the Primavera squad, notably during their victorious Supercoppa Primavera campaign against Empoli.

International career 
Alessandro Bianco is youth international for Italy, having already played with the under-18 before his debut professional season at Fiorentina.

Honours
ACF Fiorentina
 Coppa Primavera: , ;
Supercoppa Primavera : .

References

External links
Profile at the ACF Fiorentina website 

2002 births
Living people
Italian footballers
Sportspeople from Turin
Footballers from Lombardy
Association football midfielders
Italy youth international footballers
ACF Fiorentina players
Serie A players